Kawang is a village in Nogmung Township, Putao District, in the Kachin State of Myanmar.

References

External links
 "Kawang Map — Satellite Images of Kawang" Maplandia

Populated places in Kachin State